Andrea Kelly (born July 31, 1985), previously known as Andrea Crawford, is a Canadian curler from Fredericton, New Brunswick. She currently skips her own team out of the Capital Winter Club in Fredericton. She is a nine-time New Brunswick Scotties Tournament of Hearts champion skip, winning six straight titles from 2009–2014.

Career

Juniors
Kelly's first national experience came at the 2002 Canadian Junior Curling Championships, where she would represent New Brunswick. Her team would finish round robin with a 6–6 record and a seventh-place finish.

Although Kelly would not win the New Brunswick junior championship in 2003, she would attend the 2003 Canada Winter Games, where she won a bronze medal.

Kelly would return to the Canadian Junior Curling Championships in 2004, where her team would improve on their previous record. They would finish round robin in third place with a 9–3 record. She would face Quebec's Marie Cantin in the semifinal, and after a close game would lose 6–5, and take home the bronze medal.

Kelly and her team would repeat as New Brunswick champions in 2005, and again at the 2005 Canadian Junior Curling Championships she would finish round robin third with a 9–3 record. Her team would again meet Quebec and Cantin in the semifinal, this time defeating them 7–5. They would face Alberta's Desirée Robertson in the final, where they would win the game and the gold medal with a 9–6 final. At the 2005 World Junior Curling Championships, Kelly skipped Team Canada to a bronze medal.
In 2006, she was still eligible for Juniors, however she lost in her provincial championships.

2006–2011
After losing the junior provincial, Kelly entered the 2006 New Brunswick Scott Tournament of Hearts, where her team would finish round robin with a first place 6–1 record, receiving a bye to the final. She would meet veteran Heidi Hanlon in the final, where the team would win 8–7 and the right to represent New Brunswick at the 2006 Scott Tournament of Hearts. At the Hearts, the team finished round robin with a 5–6 record.

At the 2009 New Brunswick Scotties Tournament of Hearts, Kelly and her team would finish round robin undefeated, with a 7–0 record. She would defeat Mary Jane McGuire in the final to win her second Scotties title. At the 2009 Scotties Tournament of Hearts the team would again finish round robin with a 5–6 record.

At the 2010 New Brunswick Scotties Tournament of Hearts, Kelly would again repeat with an undefeated, 7–0 record in round robin play. She would face Ashley Howard in the final, and was again victorious winning 8–5. At the 2010 Scotties Tournament of Hearts, Crawford, for a third straight appearance, would finish round robin with a 5-6 record.

Kelly qualified for the 2011 New Brunswick Scotties Tournament of Hearts, and for a third consecutive year, finished the round robin undefeated with a 7–0 record. She faced Sylvie Robichaud in the final, and with a clean sweep won 7–2. At the 2011 Scotties Tournament of Hearts, Kelly had her worst showing to date, finishing round robin play with a 3–8 record.

2011–2014
Following the 2010–11 season, Kelly made significant team changes. She parted ways with longtime teammates, third Denise Nowlan and lead Lianne Sobey, bringing former second and alternate Jodie deSolla as her new lead, and in a new move added Rebecca Atkinson to skip the team. Although Atkinson became the new skip, Kelly continued to throw fourth stones. This combination worked for the squad, and the team finished in first place in the round robin, with a 6–1 record at the 2012 New Brunswick Scotties Tournament of Hearts. They defeated Mary Jane McGuire in the final, and for the fourth year in a row, Kelly represented New Brunswick at the 2012 Scotties Tournament of Hearts. The team struggled for the fourth time at a Scotties, and Kelly finished round robin play with a 5–6 record.

Kelly returned to skipping her team for the 2012–13 season and added Danielle Parsons to the second position. Her team again went undefeated at the 2013 New Brunswick Scotties Tournament of Hearts, where they won the event by defeating Melissa Adams 13–6 in the final. At the 2013 Scotties Tournament of Hearts, Kelly led her rink to the best finish of her career with a 6–5 record, which was still not good enough for the playoffs. At the 2014 New Brunswick Scotties Tournament of Hearts, Crawford lost one game en route to winning her seventh provincial title. At the 2014 Scotties Tournament of Hearts, she just missed the playoffs again, finishing 6–5.

2014–present
In April 2014, it was announced that Kelly would be joining the Edmonton, Alberta-based Val Sweeting rink as her third. On October 28, Kelly left Team Sweeting to return to New Brunswick to deal with "personal issues". She was replaced by Lori Olson-Johns.

After leaving team Sweeting, Kelly did not curl competitively until the 2016–17 season, when she played for the Andrea Schöpp while living in Germany. That arrangement lasted just one season, with Kelly taking another season off before returning in 2018–19. Kelly won her first New Brunswick Scotties upon her return in 2019, with teammates Jillian Babin, Jennifer Armstrong and Katie Forward. The team represented New Brunswick at the 2019 Scotties Tournament of Hearts, where they finished with a 3–4 record.

To start the 2019–20 season, Team Crawford won their first two events, the Steele Cup Cash and the Atlantic Superstore Monctonian Challenge. They played in a Grand Slam event, the 2019 Tour Challenge Tier 2. After a 2–2 round robin record, they lost the tiebreaker to Jestyn Murphy. The team defended their provincial title by winning the 2020 New Brunswick Scotties Tournament of Hearts in late January 2020. At the Hearts, the Crawford rink started with three losses before rallying off four wins in a row including scoring a seven ender against top-seeded Manitoba's Kerri Einarson rink to win 13–7 and defeating Team Canada (skipped by Chelsea Carey) 7–5. Their 4–3 round robin record qualified them for the tiebreaker against Saskatchewan's Robyn Silvernagle rink. Saskatchewan took two in the extra end for a 9–7 victory, eliminating New Brunswick from contention. The team announced on June 18, 2020 that they would be adding Sylvie Quillian to the team at third, replacing Jennifer Armstrong who was moving to Saskatchewan.

Due to the COVID-19 pandemic in New Brunswick, the 2021 provincial championship was cancelled. As the reigning provincial champions, Team Crawford was given the invitation to represent New Brunswick at the 2021 Scotties Tournament of Hearts, but they declined due to work and family commitments. Team Melissa Adams was then invited in their place, which they accepted.

Team Crawford played in five tour events during the 2021–22 season, performing well in all of them. In their first event, The Curling Store Cashspiel, the team reached the final where they lost to Nova Scotia's Christina Black upon giving up a stolen victory. They then lost in the final of the Steele Cup Cash two weeks later to the Melodie Forsythe rink. They would then secure two victories in their next two events, going undefeated to claim the titles of the Dave Jones Stanhope Simpson Insurance Mayflower Cashspiel and the Atlantic Superstore Monctonian Challenge. The team then had a semifinal finish at the Stu Sells 1824 Halifax Classic, dropping the semifinal game to Switzerland's Corrie Hürlimann.

The 2022 New Brunswick Scotties Tournament of Hearts was cancelled due to the pandemic and Team Crawford were selected to represent their province at the 2022 Scotties Tournament of Hearts in Thunder Bay, Ontario. At the Hearts, the team began the event with five straight wins, the most consecutive wins to start a Tournament of Hearts of any New Brunswick team. Team Crawford finished the round robin with a 6–2 record, qualifying for the playoff round over higher seeded teams such as Wild Card #2 (Chelsea Carey), Wild Card #3 (Emma Miskew) and Saskatchewan's Penny Barker. They then defeated the Northwest Territories' Kerry Galusha in the knockout round and upset Team Canada's Kerri Einarson to reach the 1 vs. 2 page playoff game, becoming the first New Brunswick team to reach the playoffs since Heidi Hanlon in 1991. They then lost to Northern Ontario's Krista McCarville in the 1 vs. 2 game and Canada's Einarson rink in the semifinal, earning the bronze medal from the event. After the event, the team announced they would be parting ways with second Jillian Babin due to her relocation to Ontario. They then announced on March 4, 2022 that Jill Brothers would be joining them as their new second.

Personal life
Kelly works as a labour relations officer for the Canadian Forces Morale and Welfare Services. She has one daughter.

Grand Slam record

Former events

References

External links

1985 births
Canadian women curlers
Curlers from New Brunswick
Living people
People from Victoria County, New Brunswick
Sportspeople from Saint John, New Brunswick
Sportspeople from Fredericton